Twin Rocks is an unincorporated community in Mendocino County, California. It lies at an elevation of 1421 feet (433 m).

References

Unincorporated communities in California
Unincorporated communities in Mendocino County, California